Sacramento Mather Airport  (Mather Airport) is a public airport 11 miles east of Sacramento, in Sacramento County, California, United States. It is on the site of Mather Air Force Base, which closed in 1993 pursuant to BRAC action.

Facilities
It has two runways: 04L/22R is 6,081 by 150 feet (1,853 x 46 m) asphalt; 04R/22L is 11,301 by 150 feet (3,445 x 46 m) concrete/asphalt. The airport has two helipads: H1 is 30 x 30 ft. (9 x 9 m); H2 is 100 x 100 ft. (30 x 30 m).

For the year ending December 31, 2018, the airport had 99,467 aircraft operations, an average of 272 per day: 51% general aviation, 13% air taxi, 5% airline, and 32% military. Fifty-two aircraft were then based at this airport: 10 single-engined, 1 multiengined, and 41 military.

Cargo airlines

Incidents
On February 16, 2000 Emery Worldwide Flight 17, a DC-8 cargo plane crashed shortly after takeoff from this airport, killing all three crewmembers.  This incident was profiled on the Canadian TV show Mayday, also known, in the United States, as Air Disasters on the Smithsonian Channel.

References

External links
 
 

Airports in Sacramento County, California